Orval William Prophet (31 August 1922 – 4 January 1984) was among the first Canadian country music performers to achieve a career of international scope.

Early life
Prophet was born in Edwards, Ontario, now part of Ottawa. During his teens, he sang pop songs within his family and performed at church and community functions. He changed his focus to country music after he heard Hank Snow's music and concluded that "Western folk-songs would fit my style".

During World War II, Prophet worked on his family's farm since health limitations precluded him from military service. He performed for injured soldiers in Ottawa, walking  from his home to their hospital.

He is a second cousin of Ronnie Prophet who is also a country musician.

Career
From 1944 to 1949, he performed throughout eastern Ontario in a country band led by Bill Sheppard. In Ottawa, his live radio performances were featured on CFRA's Fiddler's Fling from 1947 to 1951. A Canadian tour with Wilf Carter in 1949 led to Prophet's recording contract with Decca Records by late 1951. This made Prophet among the earliest Canadian country music artists who recorded in a Nashville studio.

During his early career, he worked on his family's  farm and was also a carpenter by trade. He remained based in Edwards throughout most of his career, becoming known as "The Canadian Ploughboy". His initial reason for remaining in Canada was to remain with his girlfriend. In April 1954, Prophet became a million-selling artist in terms of record sales following successful songs such as "Going Back to Birmingham", "Judgement Day Express" and "Beautiful Bells".

Prophet recorded the song "Mademoiselle" under the name "Johnny Six", released in 1958. Around that time he had a brief residency in the United States to host a radio programme.

Other appearances included CBC Television's The Tommy Hunter Show and at the Grand Ole Opry in Nashville.

Influence
When Waylon Jennings was working as a radio host prior to his singing career, he sought to adopt Prophet's singing style. Johnny Cash and Dallas Harms also wrote material for Prophet.

Death and legacy
Prophet underwent open heart surgery in 1970 following a series of five heart attacks. After this, he continued to perform until his last concert on New Year's Eve at the end of 1983. On 4 January 1984, Prophet was shovelling snow at his residence in Edwards when he died of a heart attack. He was survived by his second wife, Laurette Lalonde. His first wife, Lois Haley, died in 1969.

Later that year he was inducted into the Canadian Country Music Association Hall of Honour and in 1989 into the Canadian Country Music Hall of Fame.

Discography

Albums

Singles

References

External links
 Orval Prophet at The Canadian Encyclopedia

1922 births
1984 deaths
Canadian country singer-songwriters
Musicians from Ottawa
Canadian farmers
Canadian carpenters
20th-century Canadian male singers